Asher Lopatin (born September 1, 1964) is the executive director of the Jewish Community Relations Council/AJC, a nonprofit Jewish community organization in Bloomfield Hills, Michigan. He is an American Modern Orthodox rabbi and leader of Kehillat Etz Chayim, a Modern Orthodox synagogue in Huntington Woods, MI.  He is also the founder and executive director of the Detroit National Center for Civil Discourse, which has run a Fellowship in Civil Discourse at Wayne State University since September 2019. Previously, he was the President of Yeshivat Chovevei Torah (2013-2018) and the spiritual leader of Anshe Sholom B'nai Israel Congregation in Chicago before that. He is a Rhodes Scholar and a member of the Council on Foreign Relations.

Biographical information
Rabbi Lopatin is a graduate of the Maimonides School, and received a B.A. in International Relations and Islamic Studies from Boston University. In 1989, he was awarded a Master of Philosophy from the University of Oxford in Medieval Arabic Thought. He has also done doctoral work at Oxford in Islamic Fundamentalist Attitudes Toward Jews, authoring a chapter on Muslim/Jewish relations titled "The Uncircumcised Jewish Heart (in Islamic and Qur'anic Thought)." Lopatin's list of academic honors is significant: he won a Rhodes Scholarship, was a Wexner Fellow, a Truman Scholar, and a Boston University Trustee Scholar. He is a member of Phi Beta Kappa. He received rabbinic ordination from both Rabbi Isaac Elchanan Theological Seminary of Yeshiva University in New York City in 1996 and Rabbi Aharon Soloveichik. Lopatin also received honorary smicha from Yeshivat Chovevei Torah in 2002.

Rabbi Lopatin was the spiritual leader of Anshe Sholom B'nai Israel, a synagogue in Chicago's Lakeview neighborhood.  Since he assumed this position in 1995, the congregation has grown from only 90 members into a community of over 400.  During his tenure at Anshe Sholom, Lopatin has been instrumental in establishing the infrastructure necessary for a thriving community.  His leadership has resulted in the creation of the Adam R. Straus Memorial Mikvah (attached to ASBI), the erecting of the Lakeview Eruv, and the opening of a kosher restaurant (Milt's Barbecue for the Perplexed).  Together with his wife Rachel, Rabbi Lopatin was a founder of the multi-denominational Chicago Jewish Day School.

In 2006, Rabbi Lopatin garnered much public attention during the political battle over the Chicago City Council ban on the sale of "foie gras."  Lopatin was widely quoted supporting the ban on the grounds that Torah prohibits cruelty to animals,  stating: "Chopped liver is good, but foie gras is bad."

In 2009, Lopatin announced plans to lead a proposed group of 200 families making aliyah to settle in the Negev.  The plan was pushed back to the summer of 2012 (before being postponed indefinitely) due to a serious illness in the Lopatin family.

In February 2012, Rabbi Lopatin made news by participating in an Indonesia Interfaith Middle East Peace Tour. Five rabbis, four members of the Christian clergy, and three American Muslim clerics traveled through Indonesia (meeting with 12 Indonesian Muslim clergymen), Dubai, Jerusalem, Ramallah, and Washington, D.C.  Lopatin extensively documented the journey through blog posts on the website, Morethodoxy.

On August 30, 2012, Yeshivat Chovevei Torah Rabbinical School (YCT) officially announced that Rabbi Lopatin would succeed Rav Avi Weiss, current President and Founder, as President of the organization. In spite of having maintained positions on issues that have put him at odds with more conservative elements of Orthodoxy in the past, Lopatin has set a clear agenda for the beginning of his work at YCT: "I want to make sure Chovevei Torah is an integral part of the Orthodox world.  I do think there's a perception that Chovevei is left, for liberal Orthodoxy.  I want to start with getting the word out that we're open to right and left."  At the same time, Lopatin maintains, "I'm very pluralistic in the sense that I want the Torah message and the Jewish message to get out beyond the walls of the Orthodox synagogue and beyond those who call themselves Orthodox."

In August 2017, Lopatin announced that the 2017–18 academic year would be his last as president of YCT.

Affiliations

Chicago Board of Rabbis; Vice President (Orthodox)
International Rabbinic Fellowship; Board Member (Orthodox)
Chicago Jewish Day School; Board of Trustees, Ex Officio ("halachic, inclusive")

Honors

American Jewish Congress Young Leadership Award, 1998
Maimonides School Pillar of Maimonides Award, 2000
Associated Talmud Torahs of Chicago Keter Torah Award, 2001
Yeshivat Chovevei Torah Honorary Smicha, 2002
Newsweek Top 25 Pulpit Rabbis (#22), 2008
Newsweek America's 25 Most Vibrant Congregations (Anshe Sholom B'nai Israel), 2009
Newsweek Top 50 Rabbis (#21), 2011
Newsweek Top 50 Rabbis (#24), 2012

Ideological positions

Lopatin is noted for feeling that the denominational lines separating Jews are less important than the commitments shared by Orthodox, Conservative, Reform and non-aligned Jews.
"I am a pluralist: We need to learn from all Jews, and connect and relate to all Jews – Reform, Conservative, Renewal ; I believe it is critical for Judaism that we engage with the greater society as well...  While there is a lot to critique in the Orthodox world – Modern, Centrist and Chareidi – all of us sometimes take a strident attitude that may not exhibit sufficient respect and love for our fellow Jews and their motivations.  All of us can make an effort to try to make our first response be one of embracing all of Orthodoxy – all Jews of course, and all human beings – and being open to learning – sometimes with a critical, but respectful ear – from our fellow Orthodox Jews."

References

External links
 Interview with Rabbi Asher Lopatin, by Nicole Neroulias, November 26, 2008, Religion News Service.
 , by Raphael Ahren, August 2009, Ha'aretz
 , by Jacob Kanter, December 2009, Jerusalem Post
 The New ‘Morethodox’ Rabbi
 Rahm Emanuel's Judaism Through His Rabbi's Eyes

Living people
Alumni of Hertford College, Oxford
American Modern Orthodox rabbis
American Rhodes Scholars
Boston University College of Arts and Sciences alumni
Rabbi Isaac Elchanan Theological Seminary semikhah recipients
1964 births
20th-century American rabbis
21st-century American rabbis